Container Corporation of India Limited (CONCOR) is an Indian public sector undertaking which is engaged in transportation and handling of containers. Incorporated in March 1988 under the Companies Act, CONCOR commenced operations in November 1989 taking over an existing network of seven inland container depots (ICDs) from Indian Railways.

History
Indian Railways' strategic initiative to containerise cargo transport put India on the intermodal freight transport map for the first time in 1966. Given India's size (almost  from North to South and East to West), rail transport is often a cheaper option for all cargo over medium and long distances, especially if the cost of inter-modal transfers can be reduced. Seeing that containerised multi-modal door-to-door transport provided a solution to this problem, in 1966 Indian Railways entered the market for moving door-to-door domestic cargo in special DSO containers.

Although the first ISO container in India had been handled in Kochi as early as 1973, it was not until 1981 that the first ISO container was moved inland by Indian Railways to the country's first ICD at Bengaluru, also managed by the Indian Railways.

Expansion of the network to seven ICDs by 1988 saw an increase in container handling capacity, while along the way a strong view emerged that there was a need to set up a separate pro-active organisation to promote and manage the growth of containerisation in India.

CONCOR is one of the Indian Public Sector Undertakings that is currently under consideration for privatisation. The privatisation process, which involves the Indian Government selling 30.8% out of its shareholding of 54.8%, was initially projected to be completed in the fiscal year 2021-2022, but has since been delayed to the next fiscal year. In April 2022, the Indian Government reduced Indian Railways' land licensing fee from 6% to 3% of the land's market value, which was done to assist the company's privatisation.

Core Business
CONCOR operates three core businesses: cargo carrier; terminal operator, warehouse operator & MMLP operation.

References

External links
Container Corporation of India Ltd. (CONCOR) Official Website
Report on the Indian Logistics Industry, May 2012 - Dinodia Capital Advisors

1988 establishments in Delhi
Companies based in Delhi
Companies established in 1988
Railway companies of India
Rail freight transport in India
Government-owned companies of India
Logistics companies of India
Foreign trade of India
Companies listed on the National Stock Exchange of India
Companies listed on the Bombay Stock Exchange